Music is an art form consisting of sound and silence, expressed through time.

Music may also refer to:

In music
 Musical notation, a system for writing musical sounds with their pitch, rhythm, timing, volume, and tonality
 Sheet music, paper with printed or written musical notation on it

Albums
 Music (311 album), 1993
 Music (Carole King album), 1972
 Music (Erick Sermon album), 2001
 Music (Girugamesh album), 2008
 Music (Madonna album), 2000
 Music (Mika Nakashima album), 2005
 Music (Windsor Airlift album), 2013
 Music – Songs from and Inspired by the Motion Picture, a 2021 album by Sia to accompany her musical film Music
 Musics (album), by Dewey Redman, 1978

Songs
 "Music" (Erick Sermon and Marvin Gaye song), 2001
 "Music" (John Miles song), 1976
 "Music" (Madonna song), 2000
 "Music" (Sakanaction song), 2013
 "Music", by Darude from the 2003 album Rush
 "Music", by Kelsea Ballerini from the 2017 album Unapologetically
 "Music", by Nightwish from the 2020 album Human. :II: Nature.
 "Music", by Petula Clark from the 1965 album Downtown
 "Music", by September from the 2011 album Love CPR
 "Music", by Sia from the 2021 album Music – Songs from and Inspired by the Motion Picture
 "Music", by Witchfinder General from the 2003 album Friends of Hell

Computing
 Music (software), Apple's iTunes replacement application for playing audio content
 MUSIC, a multi-simulation coordinator software for neuronal network simulators
 MUSIC-N, the first music programming language
 MUSIC/SP, Multi-User System for Interactive Computing/System Product (originally MUSIC: "McGill University System for Interactive Computing")

Film and TV
 Music (2008 film), a drama film by Juraj Nvota
 Music (2021 film), a musical film by Sia
 Music (2023 film), a drama film by Angela Schanelec
 Music, 2010 documentary by Andrew Zuckerman
 "Music", an episode of the television program ChuckleVision

Other
 MUSIC (algorithm), a frequency estimation technique
 Music (horse), a British racehorse
 Music (surname)
 , a United States Navy patrol boat in commission from 1917 to 1918
 Wii Music, a 2008 video game for the Wii console

See also
 The Music (disambiguation)
 Musick (disambiguation)
 Musica (disambiguation)
 Musical (disambiguation)